Jack McBrayer (born May 27, 1973) is an American actor and comedian, who gained national exposure for his portrayal of characters on Late Night with Conan O'Brien and as Kenneth Parcell in 30 Rock. For his role in 30 Rock he was nominated for Primetime Emmy Award for Outstanding Supporting Actor in a Comedy Series at the 61st Primetime Emmy Awards. He has also had many voice acting roles. During his time at The Walt Disney Company, he voiced the character Fix-It Felix in the 2012 film Wreck-It Ralph and later its 2018 sequel, as well as the title character Wander in Wander Over Yonder. McBrayer has recurring roles in Phineas and Ferb, Puppy Dog Pals, The Middle and in the Netflix series Big Mouth. He appeared in The Big Bang Theory on the Season 10 premiere episode as Penny’s older brother, Randall.

For his episode role in Your Pretty Face is Going to Hell, he received a Primetime Emmy Award for Outstanding Actor in a Short Form Comedy or Drama Series nomination.

Jack McBrayer co-created and stars in the Apple TV+ series Hello, Jack! The Kindness Show, which premiered on November 5, 2021.

Early life
McBrayer was born in Macon, Georgia, and moved to Conyers, Georgia when he was 15. He attended Heritage High School and studied theater administration at the University of Evansville. At the age of 18, he had a pneumothorax. He states that it felt like a heart attack and it was one of the worst pains of his life.

Career
From 1995 to 2002, he worked at The Second City and IO Theater in Chicago, an experience that introduced him to 30 Rock creator Tina Fey and prepared him for his role on her show. McBrayer appeared in over 80 sketches on Late Night with Conan O'Brien (2002–04), often lampooning his own Southern upbringing by playing stereotypical hillbilly characters. On August 10, 2007, and September 20, 2008, he made cameo appearances on Late Night playing Kenneth Parcell from 30 Rock. During the first appearance, O'Brien remarked to him, "I thought you were above this now." McBrayer later reprised his role as Kenneth twice (November 24, 2009, and January 13, 2010) after O'Brien's switch to The Tonight Show. He appeared on O'Brien's Legally Prohibited From Being Funny on Television Tour at stops in Eugene, Oregon, Universal City, California (on the Universal Studios lot where O'Brien taped Tonight), and the final tour stop in Atlanta.

In 2008, he was featured throughout the video for "Touch My Body" by Mariah Carey. McBrayer said he accidentally hit Carey in the face with a Frisbee during the shooting for the video. McBrayer also appears in the first episode in the fifth season of Tim and Eric Awesome Show, Great Job! as a spokesman in a spoof advertisement for the fictional "Diarrhea-phragm." He worked as a voice actor in the American animated series Ugly Americans and in a recurring role on the second season of Phineas and Ferb.

In 2010, he played a role in Cats & Dogs: The Revenge of Kitty Galore. He regularly appears in the skit "Knock Knock Joke of the Day" on the hit children's television show, Yo Gabba Gabba! since season 2 and stars in Craig McCracken's TV show Wander Over Yonder on the Disney Channel. In 2011, he also appeared in The Simpsons, in the season 22 episode, "The Great Simpsina" as Ewell Freestone, 'Peach Guy.' In the fall of 2012, Jack lent his voice to the Disney animated film Wreck-It Ralph, playing the title character's close friend and video game opponent Fix-It Felix, Jr. More recently, he has starred alongside Los Angeles Clippers player Blake Griffin in Kia commercials, and in 2013 appeared in a commercial for Barnes & Noble. McBrayer's Adult Swim series The Jack and Triumph Show premiered in February 2015. In September 2016, on the season 10 premiere episode of The Big Bang Theory, McBrayer played Penny's older brother Randall.

In 2018, McBrayer was one of the actors who voiced the audiobook A Day in the Life of Marlon Bundo.

In December 2018, it was announced McBrayer would make his West End stage debut in the transfer of the Broadway musical Waitress, playing the role of Ogie, until June 15, 2019. The production opened at the Adelphi Theatre in London on February 8, 2019. In June 2019, he appeared on ITV's The Sara Cox Show.

In 2020, McBrayer had a recurring role on the comedy-mystery series Mapleworth Murders for Quibi.

In 2021, McBrayer appeared as a contestant on a Season 6 episode of the Netflix baking competition series Nailed It!.

Filmography

Film

Television

Theater

Video games

Music videos

Awards and nominations

Children's and Family Emmy Awards

Primetime Emmy Awards

Screen Actors Guild Awards

References

External links

Interview with McBrayer on The Sound of Young America
Entertainment Weekly interview  with Jack McBrayer and the actors who portray TV assistants Lloyd ("Entourage") and Marc ("Ugly Betty").

1973 births
20th-century American male actors
21st-century American male actors
Actors from Macon, Georgia
American male comedians
American male film actors
American male television actors
American male voice actors
Living people
Male actors from Georgia (U.S. state)
Upright Citizens Brigade Theater performers
University of Evansville alumni
People from Conyers, Georgia
20th-century American comedians
21st-century American comedians